Inni may refer to:

Inni, a village in Thazi Township, Myanmar
Inní ("inside") an album by the Icelandic band Sigur Rós
Inni ("hymns"), Italian for national anthems, Inno delle nazioni